Samantha Ryan (born February 5, 1969) is an American sportscaster who is a sports anchor for WABC-TV New York's Eyewitness News' weekend evening broadcasts.

Biography

Early life and education
Ryan is an alumna of the New York Institute of Technology and also majored in communications at Hofstra University.

Broadcasting career
Early in her career, Ryan worked for WBAB Babylon, New York, WVIT Hartford, and WFAN New York. She joined ABC Radio Network in 1996 and then Fox Sports New York in 2000. She started her first stint at WABC-TV ABC in September 2002.

Ryan joined ESPN in 2003, and CBS Sports and WCBS-TV in June 2006. She joined MLB Network as a studio host and reporter in September 2011 and appeared regularly on MLB Network's game productions, The Rundown, Quick Pitch, and other studio programming. She gave on-air reports from the field in the League Championship Series between the Chicago Cubs and Los Angeles Dodgers in 2017 on MLB Network and TBS. Ryan was with MLB Network until June 2018 when she returned to WABC.

Awards
Ryan won a local Emmy Award for "Outstanding Series Feature-soft" in 1999 and a local AP award in 2000.

References

External links
On-Air Personalities: Sam Ryan, MLB Network Host and Reporter (biography) – MLB Network.

American television sports announcers
Television anchors from New York City
Women sports announcers
College football announcers
National Football League announcers
Major League Baseball broadcasters
MLB Network personalities
National Hockey League broadcasters
College basketball announcers in the United States
People from Long Island
New York Institute of Technology alumni
Hofstra University alumni
Living people
American women television journalists
1969 births
21st-century American women